Ibrahim Essa (Arabic:إبراهيم عيسى) (born 10 April 1994) is an Emirati footballer. He currently plays as a goalkeeper for Khor Fakkan on loan from Al-Wasl.

External links

References

Emirati footballers
1994 births
Living people
Al-Nasr SC (Dubai) players
Al-Ittihad Kalba SC players
Hatta Club players
Al-Wasl F.C. players
Khor Fakkan Sports Club players
Association football goalkeepers
UAE Pro League players
Emirati people of Baloch descent